Beavertail Lighthouse was built in 1856 and is the premier lighthouse in Rhode Island, marking the entrance to Narragansett Bay. The  lighthouse lies on the southernmost point of Conanicut Island in the town of Jamestown, Rhode Island in Beavertail State Park, on a site where beacons have stood since the early 18th century.  The light provides navigation for boats and ships entering Narragansett Bay in the East Passage between Conanicut Island and Newport, Rhode Island on Aquidneck Island. Other lighthouses are visible from Beavertail Lighthouse, such as Castle Hill Lighthouse, Point Judith Light, and Rose Island Light.

History 
Records of the town of Jamestown from 1712 make reference to a beacon, and they mention a watch house in 1705. A wooden tower was built in 1749 (attributed to architect Peter Harrison), and the light became the third lighthouse established in the Thirteen Colonies, known at the time as "Newport Light". A fire was lit at the top of the tower, as was common for the time. Four years later, it burned down and was replaced by a stone tower.

British sailors retreating from Newport near the end of the American Revolutionary War left a trail of destruction behind them in 1779. This included burning the lighthouse and removing the optics, which left the light dark for the rest of the war.

A 3rd order Fresnel lens was placed in service, and it was the site of numerous fog-signal tests over the next 40 years under the supervision of the United States Lighthouse board. In 1898, quarters were added to the keeper's house for an assistant keeper; the assistant helped with fog-signaling, among other things.

The whistle house was destroyed during the 1938 hurricane, revealing the original base for the 1749 structure which sits  from the current tower. Whale Rock can be seen a few miles southwest of Beavertail point. Whale Rock Lighthouse and its keeper Walter Eberle were swept into the waters of Narragansett bay during the hurricane of 1938; Eberle's body was never recovered.

In 1939, the US Coast Guard took command of all lighthouses and navigational aids, and in 1989 Beavertail light was automated as part of a program by the Coast Guard. The building was restored and opened to the public in 1989, following a joint effort by the US Coast Guard, Rhode Island Parks Management, the Rhode Island Department of Environmental Management, and the town of Jamestown. In 1993, Beavertail Lighthouse Museum Association (BLMA) was established to oversee the operations of the Beavertail Lighthouse Museum, which is located in the assistant keeper's house. The museum includes a Fresnel lens and the history of many Rhode Island lighthouses.

Keepers and assistants

See also
National Register of Historic Places listings in Newport County, Rhode Island

Gallery

References

External links 

 
 Beavertail Lighthouse Maps and Plans 1817 - 1939

Lighthouses on the National Register of Historic Places in Rhode Island
Lighthouses completed in 1749
Lighthouses completed in 1856
Museums established in 1993
Lighthouse museums in Rhode Island
Museums in Newport County, Rhode Island
Lighthouses in Newport County, Rhode Island
Buildings and structures in Jamestown, Rhode Island
National Register of Historic Places in Newport County, Rhode Island